The Artist-Blacksmith's Association of North America (ABANA) was formed in 1973 to preserve and promote blacksmithing as an art and a craft.

Mission statement

The ABANA mission statement reads:

We understand that a blacksmith is one who shapes and forges iron with hammer and anvil. The artist-
blacksmith does this so as to unite the functional with the aesthetic, realizing that the two are 
inseparable. We the members of the Artist-Blacksmiths' Association of North America do join in our resolve 
to perpetuate the noble art of blacksmithing. With hammer and anvil, we will forge for mankind a richer 
life. We will preserve a meaningful bond with the past. We will serve the needs of the present, and we will 
forge a bridge to the future. Function and creativity is our purpose. Our task is great and so is our joy.

History 

The Artist-Blacksmith's Association of North America was formed in 1973 with twenty-seven members. There are now 4000 members.

Publications 

ABANA publishes two magazines: The Hammer's Blow and The Anvil's Ring.

Conferences

ABANA holds a biennial conference to education successive generations of blacksmiths and showcase modern and traditional blacksmithing to the general public. ABANA conferences typically have a gallery space to showcase the work of their members, educational spaces to provide hands-on demonstrations to all levels of smiths (novice to advanced), and demos by local and international demonstrators including artist-blacksmiths, farriers, bladesmiths, and toolsmiths. Each conference is held at a new location with the assistance of local ABANA affiliate blacksmith groups. 

Starting in 2021, ABANA held the first Iron to Art Festival which, in part, celebrated their new home office and museum space in Johnstown, Pennsylvania.

The past locations by year are as follows:

1973: Lumpkin, Georgia

1974: Lumpkin, Georgia

1975: Greenville, South Carolina

1976: Carbondale, Illinois

1978: Purchase, New York

1980: Santa Cruz, California

1982: Ripley, West Virginia

1984: De Pere, Wisconsin

1986: Flagstaff, Arizona

1988: Birmingham, Alabama

1990: Alfred, New York

1992: San Luis Obispo, California

1994: St. Louis, Missouri

1996: Alfred, New York

1998: Asheville, North Carolina

2000: Flagstaff, Arizona

2002: La Crosse, Wisconsin

2004: Richmond, Kentucky

2006: Seattle, Washington

2008: Canceled (was scheduled for New Paltz, New York)

2010: Memphis, Tennessee

2012: Rapid City, South Dakota

2014: Harrington, Delaware

2016: Salt Lake City, Utah

2018: Richmond, Virginia

2020: Canceled (was scheduled for Saratoga, New York)

2021: Iron to Art Festival, Johnstown, Pennsylvania

2022: Canceled (was scheduled for Denton, Texas)

References 

Blacksmiths